Absolute Christmas is a Christmas music compilation album in the Absolute-series marketed in Sweden by EVA Records. The album is the best selling compilation album of all time in Sweden. It sold 200 000 copies on its release in 1994 and later sold more than 500 000 copies, in a market where sales of 80,000 was the threshold for platinum 1996–2002.

Track listing

CD 1

CD 2

References 

Christmas compilation albums
1994 Christmas albums
Record label compilation albums
1994 compilation albums